Ruin Jonny's Bar Mitzvah is a live album by Me First and the Gimme Gimmes, released on October 19, 2004, on Fat Wreck Chords.

It was recorded live at an actual bar mitzvah party, and its runtime lasts their entire performance, including a break in which little can be heard other than the sounds of party guests wandering around and chatting amongst themselves. Jonny Wixen, the Bar Mitzvah boy, plays drums on one of the hidden tracks that are on the final track. The CD comes with footage of the bar mitzvah.

The album is almost entirely made up of songs that have not appeared on previous albums. The only exceptions are two hidden tracks: "Seasons in the Sun" from Have a Ball (1997) and "Sloop John B" from Blow in the Wind (2001).

Track listing

Personnel
 Spike Slawson - vocals
 Chris Shiflett (a.k.a. Jake Jackson) - lead guitar, ukulele
 Joey Cape - rhythm guitar
 Fat Mike - bass
 Dave Raun - drums

Additional musicians
 Jonny Wixen (the Bar Mitzvah boy) - drums on hidden track #16 ("Sloop John B") and spoken word vocals (Hebrew blessing) on opening track #1 “Jonny’s Blessing”
 Uncle Roger (a party guest) - French vocals on hidden track #15 ("Seasons In The Sun")

Critical reception

Giving the album three stars, David Swanson with Rolling Stone magazine said the band members "revel in kitsch and irony", adding "What's not to like?"

References 

Me First and the Gimme Gimmes albums
2004 live albums
Fat Wreck Chords live albums
Albums produced by Ryan Greene